Saint Stanislaus Church, Żelechów, Poland was built in 1741. It is located outside of the town, in the fields. Before building this Baroque church, a chapel was located there. It is the oldest preserved building in Żelechów.

References

Garwolin County
Żelechów
18th-century Roman Catholic church buildings in Poland
Baroque church buildings in Poland
Roman Catholic churches completed in 1741